Leominster State Forest is a publicly owned forest with recreational features covering  in the Massachusetts towns of Leominster, Fitchburg, Princeton, Sterling, and Westminster. The state forest encompasses an extensive trail system, numerous small ponds, and the Crow Hills. Plants such as mountain laurel are common as is an abundance of wildlife. The forest is headquarters for Massachusetts Bureau of Forest Fire Control District 8 and is managed by the Department of Conservation and Recreation.

History
The Crow Hill ledges were used by Native Americans for shelter and signaling. Artifacts in the forest include cellar holes, stonewalls, fruit trees and other remnants of Notown, an unincorporated 18th-century settlement that was annexed into adjoining municipalities in 1838. The state's first purchase at the site took place in 1922, with expansions seen in many following years including 2002. The Civilian Conservation Corps was active in the forest from 1932 to 1938, constructing a network of roads, working on the park headquarters, and developing the area at Crow Hill Pond.

Activities and amenities
Forest trails for hiking, mountain biking, cross-country skiing, and snowmobiling include a section of the Massachusetts Midstate Trail. Swimming is permitted at the beach on Crow Hill Pond, which has a bathhouse and picnicking area, and rock climbing takes place on the Crow Hills cliffs. Non-motorized boating is offered at Paradise Pond. Barrett's Pond and Crow Hill Pond are stocked with trout by the Division of Fisheries and Wildlife. The forest also offers restricted hunting.

References

External links

Leominster State Forest Department of Conservation and Recreation
Leominster State Forest Map Department of Conservation and Recreation

Massachusetts state forests
Parks in Worcester County, Massachusetts
Civilian Conservation Corps in Massachusetts
1922 establishments in Massachusetts
Protected areas established in 1922